Aurora and Cephalus is an 1811 painting by Pierre-Narcisse Guérin, now in the Pushkin Museum in Moscow. Measuring 251 × 178 cm, it illustrates lines 661-866 of Book 7 of Ovid's Metamorphoses and is a version the artist's 1810 work of the same subject. An oil sketch for the 1811 work has been in the Hermitage Museum since 1978 (inventory number GE-10310).

It and Morpheus and Iris were commissioned by Prince Nikolay Yusupov for his Arkhangelskoye Palace, where it was first exhibited in the Psyche Salon. In 1834 it was moved to the Moika Palace in St Petersburg and after the October Revolution it and other works from the Yusupov collection were seized for the national collection. In 1924 it entered the Hermitage Museum, but in 1925 it was transferred to the new Pushkin Museum in Moscow.

References

Paintings in the collection of the Pushkin Museum
1811 paintings
Paintings of Greek goddesses
Paintings based on Metamorphoses